Ernest John was Bishop - in - Nandyal from 1967 to 1974.

In 1967, the Most Reverend P. Solomon, then Moderator principally consecrated John at the CSI-Holy Cross Cathedral, Nandyal in the presence of the co-consecrator, Lesslie Newbigin, then Deputy Moderator of the Church of South India Synod.

References

Christian clergy from Andhra Pradesh
Telugu people
20th-century Anglican bishops in India
Anglican bishops of Nandyal
Indian Christian theologians
Senate of Serampore College (University) alumni
Possibly living people